In algebraic geometry, Jouanolou's trick is a theorem that asserts, for an algebraic variety X, the existence of a surjection with affine fibers from an affine variety W to X.  The variety W is therefore homotopy-equivalent to X, but it has the technically advantageous property of being affine.  Jouanolou's original statement of the theorem required that X be quasi-projective over an affine scheme, but this has since been considerably weakened.

Jouanolou's construction 

Jouanolou's original statement was:

If X is a scheme quasi-projective over an affine scheme, then there exists a vector bundle E over X and an affine E-torsor W.

By the definition of a torsor, W comes with a surjective map to X and is Zariski-locally on X an affine space bundle.

Jouanolou's proof used an explicit construction. Interpret the affine space  as the space of (r + 1) × (r + 1) matrices over S.  Within this affine space, there is a subvariety W consisting of idempotent matrices of rank one. The image of such a matrix is therefore a point in X, and the map  that sends a matrix to the point corresponding to its image is the map claimed in the statement of the theorem. To show that this map has the desired properties, Jouanolou notes that there is a short exact sequence of vector bundles:

Jouanolou deduces the theorem in general by reducing to the above case. If X is projective over an affine scheme S, then it admits a closed immersion into some projective space . Pulling back the variety W constructed above for  along this immersion yields the desired variety W for X.  Finally, if X is quasi-projective, then it may be realized as an open subscheme of a projective S-scheme. Blow up the complement of X to get , and let  denote the inclusion morphism.

Thomason's construction 

Robert Thomason observed that, by making a less explicit construction, it was possible to obtain the same conclusion under significantly weaker hypotheses.  Thomason's construction first appeared in a paper of Weibel.  Thomason's theorem asserts:

Let X be a quasicompact and quasiseparated scheme with an ample family of line bundles.  Then an affine vector bundle torsor over X exists.

Having an ample family of line bundles was first defined in SGA 6 Exposé II Définition 2.2.4.  Any quasi-projective scheme over an affine scheme has an ample family of line bundles, as does any separated locally factorial Noetherian scheme.

Thomason's proof abstracts the key features of Jouanolou's.  By hypothesis, X admits a set of line bundles L0, ..., LN and sections s0, ..., sN whose non-vanishing loci are affine and cover X.  Define Xi to be the non-vanishing locus of si, and define  to be the direct sum of L0, ..., LN.  The sections define a morphism of vector bundles .  Define  to be the cokernel of s.  On Xi, s is a split monomorphism since it is inverted by the inverse of si.  Therefore  is a vector bundle over Xi, and because these open sets cover X,  is a vector bundle.

Therefore the projection  is affine. To see that W is itself affine, apply a criterion of Serre (EGA II 5.2.1(b), EGA IV1 1.7.17). The sum of the sections f0, ..., fN is 1, so the ideal they generate is the ring of global sections. Serre's criterion now implies that W is affine.

References 

 Jouanolou, Jean-Pierre, Une Suite exact de Mayer–Vietoris en K-Theorie Algebrique. In Algebraic K-theory, I: Higher K-theories (Proc. Conf., Battelle Memorial Inst., Seattle, Wash., 1972), pp. 293–316. Lecture Notes in Math., Vol. 341. Springer, Berlin, 1973.
 Weibel, Charles A, Homotopy algebraic K-theory. In Algebraic K-theory and algebraic number theory (Honolulu, HI, 1987), volume 83 of Contemp. Math., pp. 461–488. Amer. Math. Soc., Providence, RI, 1989.

Further reading 
https://dornsife.usc.edu/assets/sites/1176/docs/PDF/Jouanolou.pdf

Algebraic geometry
Algebraic varieties
Basic concepts in set theory
Functions and mappings
Mathematical relations
Mathematical theorems
Types of functions